Ischnochiton granulifer is a small species of chiton in the family Ischnochitonidae.

References
 Powell A. W. B., New Zealand Mollusca, William Collins Publishers Ltd, Auckland, New Zealand 1979 

Ischnochitonidae
Chitons of New Zealand
Molluscs described in 1909